As a result of the 1707 union of the Kingdom of Scotland with the Kingdom of England (including Wales) to form the Kingdom of Great Britain, within the newly formed Parliament of Great Britain, Scotland had 48 constituencies representing seats for 45 Members of Parliament (MPs) in the House of Commons, normally located at the Palace of Westminster. (Westminster being the meeting place for the former Parliament of England).

Scottish Westminster constituencies were first used in the 1708 general election. Prior to that election Scotland was represented by MPs who were co-opted as commissioners of the former Parliament of Scotland.

In the Parliament of Great Britain, Scotland had 15 burgh constituencies and 33 county constituencies, with each representing a seat for one MP. The county constituencies included, however, three pairs of alternating constituencies, so that only one member of a pair was represented at any one time. Therefore, Scotland had more constituencies than seats. With the exception of Edinburgh, the burgh constituencies were districts of burghs.

1708 boundaries were used for all subsequent election of the Parliament of Great Britain.

In 1801 the Parliament of Ireland was merged with the Parliament of Great Britain to form the Parliament of the United Kingdom, also at Westminster. The first general election of the new parliament was the general election of 1802, and there was no change to the boundaries of any pre-existing Westminster constituency.

1802 boundaries were used also in the general elections of 1806, 1807, 1812, 1818, 1820, 1826, 1830 and 1831.

For the 1832 general election, Scottish Westminster constituencies were redefined by the Representation of the People (Scotland) Act 1832.

Burgh constituencies

County constituencies

References

 1708
1708 establishments in Scotland
Political history of Scotland
1708 in politics
Constituencies of the Parliament of the United Kingdom established in 1708
1832 disestablishments in Scotland
Constituencies of the Parliament of the United Kingdom disestablished in 1832